Morningside Place is a group of subdivisions located in Houston, Texas, United States.

The subdivision is not to be confused with Morningside Place, a development in southern unincorporated Harris County, Texas outside Beltway 8 which uses "Houston" addresses.

History 
The subdivision began in September 1999 when the Bliss Court, Brantwood, Carolina Place, Wessex, and Windermere subdivisions joined into one organizational entity.

In 2001 the civic association received $5,000 matching grant funds from the Matching Grant Program of the City of Houston Planning and Development Department. The funds were used to install a decorative lighting system on Morningside Street, consisting of several wrought iron, old-style light poles. The association obtained the poles from Houston Lighting & Power for $12,000. Patrick Reynolds of the Houston Chronicle said "[t]he globes will cast a soft, frosted glow onto Morningside."

Cityscape
The community, located east of Kirby Drive, is located between Southgate and the City of West University Place. It is in proximity to the Texas Medical Center, Rice University, and Rice Village. In 1999 Katherine Feser of the Houston Chronicle said that the location was one of the "selling points" of the Windermere community.

The constituent communities are Bliss Court, Brantwood, Carolina Place, Condon Oaks, Hamlet T/H Condo, McClendon/Pinnacle, Royal Oaks at Kirby, Village T/H Condo, Wessex, and Windermere.

Windermere
In 1999 Windermere had 183 houses, including bungalows, brick cottages, Colonial revival houses, and some duplexes; Feser said that the variety of housing in Windermere was "eclectic." Wooden windows and arched inside doorways are featured that are common in Windermere houses that had been constructed in the 1930s and 1940s. Many traditional single-family houses and older townhouses, and also some houses that were converted to house small businesses are located in the portion of Windermere between Rice Boulevard and University Boulevard. In 1999, Feser said that few houses had been built in Windermere in the preceding several years. During that year, Sonia Tersigne, a Greenwood King Properties real estate agent, said that homeowners in Morningside Place usually renovated their houses instead of tearing them down. Common renovations included updating kitchens and bathrooms to modern standards, installing sunrooms, and adding guest quarters over garages.

In 1999, a "tear down" house, or a house to be purchased so it could be torn down and replaced with new development, typically had a price of $150,000 ($ in current money), a recently built house typically had a price around $600,000 ($ in current money), and other varieties of houses were priced in between those extremes. In the portion between Rice Boulevard and University Boulevard, house prices were from $175,000 ($ in current money) to $300,000 ($ in current money). Area duplexes had monthly rent rates between $1,000 ($ in current money) and $1,500 ($ in current money). In 1999 Feser said "Like many close-in neighborhoods, values have risen sharply in the last few years and houses sell quickly, often with back-up offers."

Government and infrastructure
The Morningside Place Civic Association governs Morningside Place.

Morningside Place is a part of the University Place Super Neighborhood Council.

It is within Houston City Council District C.

Houston Fire Department Fire Station 37 Braes Heights  is located at 3828 Aberdeen Way. Houston Fire Department Station 33 Medical Center is near the Texas Medical Center at 7100 Fannin @ South Braeswood .

The neighborhood is within the Houston Police Department's South Central Patrol Division .

Morningside Place is in Texas's 7th congressional district  .

Harris Health System (formerly Harris County Hospital District) designated Martin Luther King Health Center in southeast Houston for ZIP code 77030. The nearest public hospital is Ben Taub General Hospital in the Texas Medical Center.

Education

Public schools

Residents are zoned to Houston Independent School District schools.
 Roberts Elementary School
 Pershing Middle School with Pin Oak Middle School as an option
 Lamar High School

In 1999 Katherine Feser of the Houston Chronicle said that the zoning to Roberts was one of the "selling points" of the Windermere community.

Private schools 
St. Vincent de Paul School, a K-8 Roman Catholic school operated by the Roman Catholic Archdiocese of Galveston-Houston, is in the area.

St. Nicholas School Medical Center Campus, a K-8 private school, is in the area.

Saint Anne Catholic School, a K-8 Roman Catholic school operated by the Roman Catholic Archdiocese of Galveston-Houston is in the area.

Public libraries 
The McGovern-Stella Link Branch of the Houston Public Library is near the neighborhood.

Media
The Houston Chronicle is the area regional newspaper.

The West University Examiner is a local newspaper distributed in the community.

The Village News and Southwest News is a local newspaper distributed in the community.

Community information
The Weekly Family YMCA is located near Morningside Place

See also

 Old Braeswood, Houston
 Southgate, Houston

References

External links
 Morningside Place
 University Place Association
 University Place Association (Archive) 

Neighborhoods in Houston